"Not Alike" is a song by American rapper Eminem featuring fellow American rapper Royce da 5'9" from the former's  tenth studio album Kamikaze (2018). It has reached the top 40 in Australia, Canada, New Zealand, Sweden, and the United States. It was written by the artists alongside producers Tay Keith and Ronny J with more production credits going to Eminem and Cubeatz.

Composition
In the first part of the song, the Tay Keith-produced instrumental that interpolates BlocBoy JB's "Look Alive", while Eminem imitates the flow of Migos' "Bad and Boujee". The second beat was produced by Ronny J. The song disses rapper Machine Gun Kelly, who called Eminem's daughter, Hailie Jade, "hot as fuck" in 2012. At the time, Kelly was 22 and Hailie was 16. The song features co-production by Cubeatz.

Response
On September 3, 2018, Machine Gun Kelly released "Rap Devil", a response to Not Alike. On September 14, 2018, Eminem responded to Rap Devil, releasing the diss track "Killshot" which damaged Kelly's reputation as a result. However, his subsequent album debuted at No.1 on the Billboard Hot 200, showing that the feud did no lasting damage to Kelly’s career.

Charts

Certifications

References

2018 songs
Eminem songs
Royce da 5'9" songs
Songs written by Eminem
Songs written by Royce da 5'9"
Songs written by Ronny J
Song recordings produced by Tay Keith
Songs written by Tay Keith
Trap music songs
Song recordings produced by Ronny J
Song recordings produced by Eminem
Song recordings produced by Cubeatz